Joseph Peller (born 1953) is an artist and current teacher at the Art Students League of New York.

Biography 
Initially Peller studied with Canadian artist A.K. Scott, a pupil of the distinguished American painters Charles W. Hawthorne and George Bellows.  While studying at the School of Architecture at the University of Toronto he worked with artists Kenneth Forbes and Cleeve Horne.  In New York, Peller studied with Ronald Sherr at the National Academy of Design and Thomas Fogarty Jr., Roberto De Lamonicam and Hilary Holmes at the Art Students League, where  in 1985 he received a Revson Foundation Grant.

Peller has taught at the New York Academy of Art.

References

1953 births
Canadian painters
Living people
University of Toronto alumni